Our Community Place is a community center created by a former Salvation Army building located in Harrisonburg, Virginia, United States. The building was converted to a community center after Ron Copeland acquired ownership in 1999. After a lengthy renovation period, the center opened to the community in August 2008.

History 
In 1999, Ron Copeland, owner of the Little Grill Collective across the street, purchased the then-vacant Salvation Army building at 17 East Johnson Street in Harrisonburg, Virginia — with hopes of creating a community center as an extension of the weekly soup kitchen he operated at his restaurant. Our Community Place opened to the Harrisonburg, Virginia community in August 2008.

After a brief "hiatus" to allow for review and redirection, the center reopened October 11, 2011. Founder and by-then former executive director of the organization, Ron Copeland, said this was not a "reincarnation as a change so much as a refocusing on its original mission." According to Copeland, OCP staff and volunteers had become "overworked" by a single aspect of the organizational mission: serving as a day homeless shelter. This led to a decision by the board of directors to close the center temporarily on September 1, 2011.

Community center hours were significantly reduced after reopening, and Philip Fisher Rhodes took over as executive director. The 28-year-old central Valley native had first gotten involved with Our Community Place a few years before. Copeland continued to serve as pastor and president of the board of directors. As he said, "I had three full-time jobs, and I gave up two of them. . . I'm very excited to begin focusing on the work of the church I'm a pastor of." Copeland directed Early Church, a Mennonite congregation that meets at OCP.

The center, which had been offering its lawn as a place for area homeless to reside, was forced to end this policy in the summer of 2019 by the city of Harrisonburg.

July 29, 2019 was the last day "people could stay at our property [overnight], and the primary reason for that was that the city has made clear that under the current laws our zoning does not allow for overnight sheltering,” said OCP director Sam Nickels. This change in availability of space for the homeless to stay forced the city to consider developing other options.

This situation freed OCP to focus on its priority programs. As Nickels stated:

City Manager Eric Campbell stated city staff had been working for months to identify gaps in the local services offered to homeless people and wondering, “How do we begin to address these gaps?” He considered the “ongoing coalition” useful for discussing solutions among both city and nongovernmental organizations. Council member George Hirschmann saw further discussion helping “identify lanes of action that we could put a price tag on.”

Community role 

OCP operates and manages a community center that "offers creative community meals, recreational activities, meaningful work, rest from the elements, positive relationships, spiritual guidance, and some basic services for individuals struggling with homelessness." It runs a restaurant every Friday at lunchtime which provides "an opportunity for employment, skill building volunteerism, and a fresh hot meal for those who are housing and financially insecure in our area." In a January 7, 2021 letter to the editor entitled "Nobody Should Be Hungry" in the local newspaper, Nickels said, "We serve a free hot breakfast Monday through Friday at 8 a.m., lunch at noon, we hand out groceries to families in need, and refer people to a variety of resources that can help with utility payments, rent/mortgage payments. We help people access housing when homeless and other needs. . ."

The center "provides 17,000 meals a year to the city’s homeless and others with food insecurity, in addition to a number of other services, including laundry and shower services, storage lockers, case management, volunteer and job training opportunities, and help finding housing. Other shelter services for the homeless in Harrisonburg look to OCP to provide overflow support when the weather turns particularly cold. As Ashley Robinson, shelter director of the Open Door Thermal Shelter, said during a cold snap in January 2022, “What we’ve been looking into is possibly extending hours and working with other organizations like Our Community Place, just trying to keep our unhoused neighbors safe and warm.” The center opens on weekends for such emergency use. 

OCP extends its hours during extremely cold weather, requiring additional shelter monitors during the day (raising total staff requirement to six).

The center serves 100 people or so at Thanksgiving each year; its volunteers additionally delivered 40 meals to "people in need around the community" in 2022.

Humankind Water, as part of a new program called “The Humankind Water Drop” with the goal of delivering 100,000 liters of water to homeless shelters across the country. In August 2021, the organization donated water to Mercy House in Harrisonburg.

OCP also provides relief from the heat of summer. As case management specialist Amanda Morris states: "we provide people kind of a cool place to come in just to hang out and get outside of the heat.” Adds kitchen coordinator Margot Heffernan, “We put big water jugs out in the early part of the day, even before we open so that there’s always a source of water for people when they’re feeling especially hot.”

Housing 
OCP aims to “Move more folks out of chronic homelessness and into these permanent housing units with supportive, ongoing case management to try to help them not fall into the circle of going in and out of housing but to stay in that housing and overcome the barriers they have in life.” The center helped 90+ homeless people find housing during the COVID-19 pandemic.

“Unfortunately, most of our community members have barriers to housing that prevent them from accessing it through the conventional market” Tim Cummings, OCP Housing Specialist, said. In response to these challenges, Nickles announced in December 2021 that “our big news is we’ve just purchased our first property. It has two units in it and we hope to expand it to four units. It’s sort of a pilot program, so if it works out well, hopefully we will do another one.”

The center began working with Harrisonburg-area landlords in 2020 to help them better understand the needs of OCP's client population. Property management companies tend to erect "barriers, making it difficult for those who are low-income, have been previously incarcerated, or have a history of eviction to gain access to equitable housing." In 2020 OCP placed upwards 50+ people in permanent housing. They had "solidified 15 placements" through the Spring of 2021.

As Vance Fowler, 45, who has lived at a property on Reservoir Street owned by OCP since December 2021, stated:

OCP has applied for a special-use permit and rezoning request for another project on Reservoir Street consisting of four units of one-bedroom dwellings for people "transitioning out of homelessness."

In March 2022, The Central Shenandoah Planning District Commission announced $1.66 million in gap funding to regional developers of affordable housing. Made possible through the Virginia Housing PDC Housing Development Program, these grant funds are a pilot program meant to promote affordable housing initiatives. OCP was awarded $118,106 of the total for two apartment units in their Block House Apartments project. “These monies will cover half the cost for Our Community Place to build two efficiency apartments for the most vulnerable and low-income homeless persons in our region,” stated Nickels.

When the City of Harrisonburg announced in June 2022 it intended to purchase a 6,730-square-foot building situated on 3.72 acres of land on North Main Street from Shenandoah Presbytery for $700,000, committing additional monies to converting the property into a permanent, low-barrier homeless shelter, Nickels expressed his excitement about the impact of the project. As a result of this commitment on the part of the city, he stated, “We have an opportunity now as a community to plan comprehensive homeless services. How can we effectively put together those services in a way that really helps folks to move on from homelessness?” Providing for affordable housing for all is a major aim included in Harrisonburg's 2039 Vision Plan, the City Council agreeing in November 2021 that part of the city's $23.8 million in American Rescue Plan Act funds should be used to provide a permanent homeless shelter.

When Open Doors, the low-barrier shelter system housing up to 50 people each night on James Madison University property, ceased operation in August 2022, some "unhoused" Harrisonburg residents were considering other options, including sleeping on the sidewalks around OCP. Director Nickels stated about the situation:

OCP participated in a meeting of city and community leaders hosted by Harrisonburg Mayor Deanna Reed to discuss short-term options for providing overnight shelter for the homeless.

Garden 
Activities and programming coordinator, Leons Kabongo, directs the Young Jupiter Market Garden, an OCP project, "where community volunteers help prepare the soil, plant and harvest the produce and, of course, pull weeds." According to the developer of the garden, the “Young” in the name is meant "to inspire youth to learn about their environment, nature and growing their own food." Kabongo wants the garden "to be a place that marginalized people can come to as a refuge." The garden operates on a half-acre between two houses nearby the center on Madison Street.

Kabongo grew up with a little garden at his house in the Democratic Republic of the Congo where he “used to always arrive to school dirty. My school uniform had dirt on it because I had worked in my little garden before heading off to class. I never loved to stay inside. I need to be outdoors.” He came to the U.S. at 14, playing American football well enough in high school to get an athletic scholarship to Shepherd University in West Virginia. Graduating there with an economics degree in 2013, he was on his way to a career with the World Bank when he encountered Bruce and Greg Butler, brothers who run a large farm in Inwood, West Virginia.

The Butler brothers said to Kabongo, “You were meant for something great, why are you here?” Working a one-year internship on their farm, Kabongo grew "dozens of fruits and vegetables and raise(d) beef cattle" and realized his “body, mind and spirit were being fed.” The "Jupiter" in the name of the garden he founded in Harrisonburg was meant to give others the feeling he found working the land.

Funding 

OCP fundraising events include a monthly Night Out, with a local chef preparing food. For years they offered an annual bicycle festival and plant sale. They produced four Christmas CDs made up of songs donated by area musicians and those friendly to OCP. On January 14, 2012, Ketch Secor and Chris "Critter" Fuqua of Old Crow Medicine Show performed in a benefit concert for OCP across the street at the Little Grill Collective diner. Secor and Fuqua in junior high school in Harrisonburg and performed often at the Little Grill open mics.

For the second time, Impact Ministries of Elkton, Virginia – founded in 2012 by Pastor Brad Lewis in a garage – chose OCP as the organization to sponsor with one of its charity motorcycle rides in 2019. Thirty riders participated in the fundraising event on a Saturday in October, raising over $500 in charitable contributions.

As a result of the COVID-19 shutdown, OCP decided to combine their two major fundraising events – a Fall Gala and the Christmas Concert – in 2020. Local chef Tassie Pippert worked with the center's cooks to prepare the dinner for the Fall Gala. Ketch Secor of Old Crow Medicine Show and Trent Wagler of The Steel Wheels performed during the live-streamed concert. Executive director, Sam Nickels, described getting through the pandemic as "an unpredictable and crazy roller coaster."

OCP worked with three other Harrisonburg organizations – Mercy House, Open Doors, and the Suitcase Clinic – pooling their resources to "bolster aid . . during the era of COVID-19, which has required an additional level of coordination to keep vulnerable clients safe and healthy." The center benefited from Federal funding through the Coronavirus Aid, Relief and Economic Security (CARES) Act passed by Congress which allowed the center to retain all of its existing staff and giving them "the freedom to hire additional staff to meet the expanded programming needs stemming from the COVID-19 emergency,” said Eric Olson-Getty, director of development and administration.

OCP participates in the Harrisonburg-Rockingham County Great Community Give each year. In April 2022 they collected over $50,000 out of a total of $1.72 raised during this charitable event. From 2003, and for years thereafter, OCP sponsored a plant sale with live music, also in April. 

The center was one of 12 community partners in the Harrisonburg area who received $14,000 out of a total of more than $518,000 as part of the Sentara Healthcare Fall 2022 "Sentara Cares" grant cycle. This funding will go "specifically to our case management program. . allow(ing) case managers to visit folks in their houses. It will help cover transportation costs. So we can work with people in their housing to resolve issues and keep them housed,” Nickels states.

Solar panels 
In 2018, Give Solar, a nonprofit organization founded by Jeff Heie, decided to make OCP their next project, after previously working with Eastern Mennonite University and Gift and Thrift in Harrisonburg. The organization "raises money and seeks grants to provide solar energy to other nonprofits that can benefit from the cost savings that solar energy can provide." $25,000 in solar panels were installed with the help of volunteers in a “solar barn-raising”. Give Solar was granted $9,000 by the Merck Company Foundation. An additional $9,000 had been raised through crowdfunding and "affinity groups". The solar panels are expected to reduce the community center's electric bill by 75 percent, which should amount to about $3,600 a year in savings.

Personnel 
As of February 2021, Sam Nickels served as executive director and Leons Kabongo was Place Activities and Programming Coordinator. Eric Olson-Getty was administrative director, replaced by Corey Chandler in that role. Nickels earns just under $40,000 per annum in salary.

Tim Cummings serves as Housing Specialist and Amanda Morris as "case management specialist". Margot Heffernan is "kitchen coordinator".

Gallery

Major organizational funders 
 Merck Foundation
 JustPax Fund
 United Way
 Bank of America
 SunTrust Bank
 Food Lion
 First Presbyterian Church of Harrisonburg
 Shalom Mennonite Church
 Community Mennonite Church
Denton Family Foundation
Rockingham County
In February 2018, OCP received a $3,000 grant from the Wells Fargo Foundation, proceeds from which they planned to use "to supply nearly 400 meals". Grant recipients were chosen by local branches of Wells Fargo banks. The Denton Family Foundation presented OCP with a check for $33,200 on November 16, 2021. The foundation annual hosts a golf tournament to raise money to donate to non-profit organizations in Harrisonburg and Rockingham County. On presenting the check, Terri Denton, whose father established the foundation, said:

The Rockingham County budget for fiscal year 2023 includes $15,000 for OCP.

References

External links 

 
 Our Community Place Our Community Place
 GuideStar: Our Community Place
 GreatNonProfits: Our Community Place
 United Way: Our Community Place

2001 establishments in Virginia
Buildings and structures completed in 1928
Buildings and structures in Harrisonburg, Virginia
Community centers in the United States
Event venues in Virginia